Calliotropis vaillanti is a species of sea snail, a marine gastropod mollusk in the family Eucyclidae.

Description
The height of the shell attains 8 mm.

Distribution
This species occurs in the Atlantic Ocean off Portugal, the Azores and the Cape Verdes at depths between 495 m and 1674 m.

References

 P. Fischer, 1882. Journ. Conch., XXX, p. 50.
 Dautzenberg et H. Fischer, 1894. Mém. Soc. Zool. France, IX, p. 477, pl. XX, fig. 12

External links
  Serge GOFAS, Ángel A. LUQUE, Joan Daniel OLIVER,José TEMPLADO & Alberto SERRA (2021) - The Mollusca of Galicia Bank (NE Atlantic Ocean); European Journal of Taxonomy 785: 1–114

vaillanti
Gastropods described in 1882
Molluscs of the Atlantic Ocean
Molluscs of the Azores
Gastropods of Cape Verde